William Dalrymple may refer to:

 William Dalrymple (1678–1744), Scottish Member of Parliament
 William Dalrymple (moderator) (1723–1814), Scottish minister and religious writer
 William Dalrymple (British Army officer) (1736–1807), Scottish general and MP for Wigtown Burghs and Duleek
 William Dalrymple (surgeon) (1772–1847), English surgeon
 William Dalrymple (historian) (born 1965), Scottish historian and writer

See also
 William Dalrymple Maclagan (1826–1910), Archbishop of York